Wendell Lawrence (born July 6, 1967) is a retired male triple jumper from the Bahamas, best known for finishing 17th at the 1992 Olympic Games. He set his personal best (17.20 m) in 1992.

He Attended Boise State University where he was an All-American. He was inducted into the Boise State Hall of Fame in 1996.

Achievements

References

sports-reference

1967 births
Living people
Bahamian male triple jumpers
Athletes (track and field) at the 1991 Pan American Games
Athletes (track and field) at the 1992 Summer Olympics
Olympic athletes of the Bahamas
Pan American Games medalists in athletics (track and field)
Pan American Games bronze medalists for the Bahamas
Medalists at the 1991 Pan American Games